Sukyoung Lee is a professor at Pennsylvania State University known for her research on circulation in Earth's atmosphere and the Southern Ocean. In 2021 Lee was elected a fellow of the American Geophysical Union.

Education and career 
Lee earned her Ph.D. in 1991 from Princeton University where she worked on baroclinic waves. As of 2021, she is a professor at Pennsylvania State University.

Research 
Lee is known for her research on Earth's atmosphere, ocean circulation in the Southern Ocean, planetary atmospheres, and climate. In 2013, her research revealed that recent changes in the ozone layer causes geographic shifts in the location of the jet stream.

Selected publications

Awards and honors 

 Fellow, American Geophysical Union (2021)
 Wilson Award for Excellence in Research, Pennsylvania State University (2021)

References

External links 

 

Fellows of the American Geophysical Union
Princeton University alumni
Pennsylvania State University faculty
Women meteorologists
Atmospheric scientists
Year of birth missing (living people)
Living people